The finals and the qualifying heats of the Women's 200 metres Butterfly event at the 1997 FINA Short Course World Championships were held on the first day of the competition, on Thursday 17 April 1997 in Gothenburg, Sweden.

Finals

Qualifying heats

See also
1996 Women's Olympic Games 200m Butterfly
1997 Women's European LC Championships 200m Butterfly

References
 Results
 swimrankings

B
1997 in women's swimming